Performing arts presenting organizations facilitate exchanges between artists and audiences through creative, educational, and performance opportunities. The work that these artists perform is produced outside of the presenting organization.

Performing arts presenters are typically found in three varieties:
Those attached to a college, university, or other educational institution, with performances usually taking place on campus;
Those that are an administrative branch of a theater or concert hall, usually presenting performances only in that space;
Those that are independently administered outside any specific venue, usually renting multiple venues for performances.

The Association of Performing Arts Presenters, located in Washington, D.C., is the largest organizing body of performing arts presenters in the United States. The primary international organizing body of performing arts presenters is the International Society for the Performing Arts.

Performing arts presenters in the United States
 Texas Performing Arts (The University of Texas, Austin, TX)
 Celebrity Series of Boston (Boston, Massachusetts)
 Rockport Music (Rockport, Massachusetts)
 University Musical Society (Ann Arbor, Michigan)
 Whitefish Theatre Company (Whitefish, Montana)
 Hopkins Center for the Arts (Dartmouth College, Hanover, New Hampshire)
 The Music Hall, (Portsmouth, New Hampshire)
Philharmonic Society of Orange County (Irvine, California)

See also 
 Entertainment
 Performing arts
 Performing arts education
 Family entertainment center

References

 
Performing arts
Performing arts education
Entertainment